Krasnoye Pole is a rural locality (a village) in Mardengskoye Rural Settlement, Velikoustyugsky District, Vologda Oblast, Russia. The population was 38 as of 2002. There are 9 streets.

Geography 
Krasnoye Pole is located 5 km northwest of Veliky Ustyug (the district's administrative centre) by road. Veliky Ustyug is the nearest rural locality.

References 

Rural localities in Velikoustyugsky District